ADR Desportivo de Mansabá is a football (soccer) club from Guinea-Bissau based in Mansabá. 

Mansabá was promoted to the Campeonato Nacional da Guiné-Bissau after the 2004–05 season. The club finished third in the 2005–06 season.

Achievements
Campeonato Nacional da Guiné-Bissau: 1
1996
Taça Nacional da Guiné Bissau: 2
2001, 2011

Performance in CAF competitions
CAF Confederation Cup: 1 appearance
2012 –

References

Football clubs in Guinea-Bissau